Harry Byrd may refer to:

Harry F. Byrd (1887–1966), U.S. politician
Harry Clifton Byrd (1889–1970), known as "Curley Byrd", U.S. politician, university president, multi-sport athlete and coach
Harry F. Byrd Jr. (1914–2013), U.S. politician, son of Harry F. Byrd Sr.
Harry Byrd (baseball) (1925–1985), American Major League Baseball pitcher

See also
 Henry Byrd
 Henry Bird (disambiguation)
 Dickie Bird (Harold Dennis Bird, born 1933), cricket umpire